Josh Littlejohn  is a social entrepreneur, philanthropist and homeless campaigner who founded charities the Social Bite and the World’s Big Sleep Out.

Early life and education 
Josh Littlejohn was born on 16 September 1986 in Edinburgh, United Kingdom. He has an honours degree in Politics and Economics from Edinburgh University.

Career 
In August 2012 Littlejohn and Alice Thompson co-founded the Social Bite, a small chain of sandwich shops that donates its profits to social causes.

Littlejohn built a Social Bite Village from reclaimed wasteland in Edinburgh to provide shelter and support for up to 20 homeless people.

In December 2019, Littlejohn launched the World’s Big Sleep Out, which took place in 52 cities including London, New York, Delhi and Hong Kong. In 2016, he co-founded a social enterprise beer company called Brewgooder, where the profits go towards providing clean water. The brewery set out an aim of providing clean drinking water for one million people in five years.

He has appeared on the One Show and BBC Breakfast. Newspaper interviews include The New York Times, The Guardian and The Times.

Recognition 
In 2017, Littlejohn was given an MBE in the New Years Honours list. He has received an honorary Doctor of Science in Social Science  from the University of Edinburgh and honorary doctorates from Robert Gordon University , Edinburgh Napier University, and Queen Margaret University

He was  included in the Debrett’s list of 500 most influential people in the UK 2017.

Littlejohn collected the Pride of Britain Special Recognition award in 2019.

In 2020, he won the Robert Burns Humanitarian Award for helping helpless people.

References 

Living people
1986 births
Philanthropists from Edinburgh
Scottish activists
Alumni of the University of Edinburgh
Scottish philanthropists
Members of the Order of the British Empire